Cressington is a Liverpool City Council Ward in the Garston and Halewood Parliamentary constituency. It contains the Cressington Park, Grassendale Park in the Garston area of Liverpool. The population of the ward at the 2011 census was 14,503. The ward was created for the 2004 municipal election from parts of the former Grassendale ward part of the Garston borough of Liverpool. The area is served by Cressington railway station.

The current councillors elected to serve Cressington are Councillors Sam Gorst, Lynnie Williams and Richard Clein.

Councillors

 indicates seat up for re-election after boundary changes.

 indicates seat up for re-election.

 indicates change in affiliation.

 indicates seat up for re-election after casual vacancy.

Election results

Elections of the 2010s

Elections of the 2000s 

After the boundary change of 2004 the whole of Liverpool City Council faced election. Three Councillors were returned.

•bold - Denotes the winning candidate.
•italics - Denotes sitting Councillor.

External links
Liverpool Street Gallery - Liverpool 19
Ward Profile

References

Wards of Liverpool